The steamboat Fleetwood operated in the 1880s and 1890s on the Columbia River and later as part of the Puget Sound Mosquito Fleet.

Construction
Fleetwood was built in 1881, at Portland, Oregon, for Captain U.B. Scott and his associates L.B. Seeley and E.W. Creighton.  Fleetwood was propeller-driven, 111' long, and rated at 135 tons.

Operations on Columbia River
Capt. Scott successfully ran Fleetwood on the Astoria and Cascade routes on the Columbia River, in opposition to the would-be monopoly of the Oregon Railway and Navigation Company, then under the control of Henry Villard. Fleetwood outran the monopoly's steamers by two hours on the Astoria run, and built up so much business that Captain Scott had to replace her with the crack sternwheeler Telephone. Captain Scott trimmed up Fleetwood ‘s appearance a bit, not entirely to the liking of historian Newell:
Other masters of Fleetwood on the Columbia River included Capt. William H. Whitcomb, a member of a prominent Northwest marine family, and, on Puget Sound, Capt. Henry Carter.

Transfer to Puget Sound
In 1888, Capt. U.B. Scott sold Fleetwood to Capt. Z.J. Hatch, who transferred the vessel to Puget Sound.  Fleetwood was brought around to Puget Sound by Captain Messegee for her new owner Capt. Hatch.  On the way up, Captain Scott’s fancy trim work on the deckhouse caught fire, but the crew were able to extinguish it and  Fleetwood rounded Cape Flattery and reached Neah Bay just 24 hours after leaving the Columbia Bar.  Once on Puget Sound  Fleetwood ran against another boat transferred up from the Columbia River,  Emma Haywood.  Fleetwood was advertised as a "fast time" steamer, leaving Horr's Wharf at Olympia at 6:00 a.m., stopping at Puget City, Steilacoom, and the Northern Pacific Railway wharf at Tacoma, and reaching Seattle's Yesler wharf at noon, then returning on the same route, arriving back in Olympia at 7:00 p.m.

In 1889,  Fleetwood  made record time on a trip from Olympia to Seattle to carry a steam fire engine to the aid of that city during its great fire. When Captain Scott expanded operations up to Puget Sound, he bought back  Fleetwood and put her on the Seattle-Tacoma run with the new and eventually much more famous propeller steamer  Flyer. On September 7, 1890, Fleetwood engaged unsuccessfully in an impromptu race between Tacoma and Seattle with the then brand-new and very fast sternwheeler Greyhound.

Abandonment
In 1898 Fleetwood was abandoned on the beach in Quartermaster Harbor where for many years she was visible as she slowly rotted away.

Notes

References
Gibbs, Jim and Williamson, Joe, Maritime Memories of Puget Sound, at 129, Schiffer Publishing, West Chester, PA 1987  (publishing photo showing both Fleetwood abandoned on beach and her location relative to the floating drydock at Quartermaster Harbor.)

External links

Historic images from University of Washington on-line collections
steamer Fleetwood in operation, apparently on Puget Sound
Fleetwood in operation, apparently circa 1895 near Seattle
once speedy steamer Fleetwood, abandoned and rotting on beach at Dockton, 1908

Steamboats of Washington (state)
Propeller-driven steamboats of Washington (state)
Steamboats of the Columbia River
Steamboats of Oregon
1881 ships